A Place Like This may refer to:

 A Place Like This (album), a 1988 album by Robbie Nevil
 A Place Like This (EP), a 2014 EP by Majid Jordan
 "A Place Like This" (song), a 2014 song by Majid Jordan